Ruger Lake is located in Glacier National Park, in the U. S. state of Montana. Nearby mountains include Longfellow Peak and Paul Bunyans Cabin to the west.

See also
List of lakes in Flathead County, Montana (A-L)

References

Lakes of Glacier National Park (U.S.)
Lakes of Flathead County, Montana